Buddha Dharma wa Nepāl Bhāsā was the first magazine in Nepal Bhasa. It was published in 1925 from Kolkata, India by Dharmaditya Dharmacharya. 

The inaugural issue came out on the festival marking the anniversary of Lord Buddha's Birth, Enlightenment and Nibbana. The magazine was known as Buddha Dharma until 1927.

History
Dharmaditya Dharmacharya (1902-1963), born Jagat Man Vaidya in Lalitpur, worked for the revival of Theravada Buddhism in Nepal and development of Nepal Bhasa journalism. Government suppression of Buddhism and Nepal Bhasa in Nepal led Dharmaditya to carry out his activities from Kolkata where he had originally gone to pursue his studies.

Articles
As part of the efforts to spread the word of the Buddha according to Theravada, Dharmaditya published articles in Nepal Bhasa, Hindi, Bengali and English in various magazines emphasizing the importance of Buddhism in Nepal. In 1925, he published Buddha Dharma containing articles explaining its basic principles as given in ancient texts. He also wrote articles calling for celebration of the Buddha's birth anniversary in Lumbini, his birthplace in southern Nepal. In 1927, Buddha Dharma was renamed Buddha Dharma wa Nepal Bhasa (meaning "Buddhism and Nepal Language") and became a joint Buddhist and literary magazine. Publication ceased in 1930.

See also
Dhammalok Mahasthavir
Dharmaditya Dharmacharya
Dharmodaya
Kindo Baha
Pranidhipurna Mahavihar
Banishment of Buddhist monks from Nepal
Nepal Bhasa journalism

References

Buddhist magazines
Defunct literary magazines
Defunct magazines published in India
Magazines established in 1925
Magazines disestablished in 1930
Mass media in Kolkata
Magazines published in Nepal
Newar language
Religious magazines
1925 establishments in Nepal